The 2010 USC Trojans football team represented the University of Southern California in the 2010 NCAA Division I FBS college football season. The Trojans were led by head coach Lane Kiffin, who was in his 1st season. They played their home games at the Los Angeles Memorial Coliseum as members of the Pacific-10 Conference.

Pre-season
 July 1, 2010 – Running backs coach Todd McNair's contract expired June 30, 2010. He played a key part in the NCAA's investigation of the school's athletic department dealing with former Trojans running back Reggie Bush.
 July 6, 2010 – Seantrel Henderson, the nation's No. 1-ranked offensive tackle recruit was given a release from his commitment to play with USC. Following the release from his commitment, Henderson signed to play with the University of Miami (Fla.) Hurricanes football team. Defensive end Malik Jackson is transferring to Tennessee.

Schedule

Game summaries

Hawaii Warriors

The Trojans began the season by taking advantage of the NCCA's Hawaii scheduling exemption which permits an extra non-conference game when traveling to Hawaii, which allowed them a 13-game schedule without a bowl game. The game turned out to be an offensive showcase, with Matt Barkley throwing a USC record-tying five touchdowns.

Virginia Cavaliers

In their home debut the Trojans hosted the Virginia Cavaliers, who played their first game ever in the state of California. Compared with the previous match's high-scoring, the game remained close with the Cavaliers failing by only three points.

Minnesota Golden Gophers

USC extended its victory streak against Big Ten schools to 11 games in a road win against the embattled Golden Gophers, who lost their previous game to FCS foe South Dakota. Minnesota went on to fire its head coach Tim Brewster later in the season.  The game was also the 19th straight nonconference win by the Trojans, a streak that would be broken later in the season by Notre Dame.

Washington State Cougars

Southern California began their conference schedule after dropping six spots in the AP rankings since the preseason poll despite going undefeated.  Washington State scored on their opening drive, but the Trojans went on to score 50 points in a blowout, earning Lane Kiffin a 4-0 record, the best start of a USC coach's tenure since Jess Hill in 1951.

Washington Huskies

For consecutive years, head coach Steve Sarkisian's Washington Huskies upset the Trojans by kicking a last-second field goal. Sarkisian was an assistant coach at USC prior to taking over the program at Washington.

Erik Folk, who hit the game-winning field goal for Washington, was named Pac-10 special teams player of the week. He went 4-for-4 on field goals and completed two PAT attempts. The previous year, Folk kicked a 22-yarder to defeat the Trojans 16-13.

Stanford Cardinal

For the second week in a row USC lost in the final seconds of the game by a field goal, as Stanford kicker Nate Whitaker made a 30-yarder as time expired. It marked the first time since 2000 that Stanford defeated the Trojans at Stanford Stadium, and the first time since 2001 that USC has lost two games in a row.

California Golden Bears

Matt Barkley once again tied the USC mark for touchdown passes in a game by throwing five to put the Trojans up 42-0 at halftime.  USC rested its starters in the second half, allowing 14 points, but still prevailed by 34 points.

Oregon Ducks

The Ducks came into the game ranked 1st in the AP poll.  The previous three weeks a team ranked number one had lost, but the Trojans were unable to continue this streak.  USC had a three-point lead in the third quarter, but Oregon scored all the game's remaining points and won by margin of three touchdowns.

Arizona State Sun Devils

The Trojans eked out a single-point victory against Arizona State thanks to a rare defensive two-point conversion in the fourth quarter. After the Sun Devils scored a touchdown to put them in the lead by four points Torin Harris blocked the extra point and ran it back to the opposite end-zone, cutting ASU's newly found lead to two.  Kicker Joe Houston later kicked a 29-yard field to put the Trojans in the lead, which they maintained during the game's final minutes.

Arizona Wildcats

USC beat Arizona to extend its win streak in Tucson to nine with a 160-yard performance by Marc Tyler and avenged their season-ending loss from the previous year.

Oregon State Beavers

The Trojans lost their third straight game in Corvallis and lost Matt Barkley to injury late in the second quarter.  Oregon State's 36–7 victory marked the worst defeat for USC against the Beavers in 96 years.

Notre Dame Fighting Irish

 
Playing with its backup quarterback Mitch Mustain, USC lost to Notre Dame and ended its victory streak against its arch rival dating back to 2001. The Fighting Irish scored the go-ahead touchdown with 2:23 remaining in the game, and the Trojans failed to convert a two-minute drill after a pass to Ronald Johnson that would have resulted in a touchdown and the probable win was dropped.  Mustain later threw an interception that ended the game and gave Notre Dame the victory.

UCLA Bruins

After losing to rival Notre Dame the week before, USC bounced back to close their season with a win over cross-town rival UCLA to retain the Victory Bell.  Quarterback Matt Barkley returned after missing the previous week and threw one of the team's two touchdown passes.  Allen Bradford led the Trojans by gaining 212 yards rushing and catching a 47-yard touchdown throw to extend the victory streak against the Bruins to four.

Rankings

References

USC
USC Trojans football seasons
USC Trojans football